The Central Andean puna is a montane grasslands and shrublands ecoregion in the Andes of southern Peru, Bolivia, and northern Argentina.

Setting
The landscape in this ecoregion consists of high mountains with permanent snow and ice, meadows, lakes, plateaus, and valleys. It transitions to the Central Andean wet puna to the north and the Central Andean dry puna to the south.

Climate
The climate is Köppen climate classification cold semi-arid.

Flora
Flora consists typically of open meadows with rocks, bunchgrass, herbs, moss, and lichen. Grasses are represented by the genera Calamagrostis, Agrostis, and Festuca. Parastrephia lepidophylla and Margyricarpus are small bush species found here. Azorella compacta and Puya raimondi are shared with the wet puna. Polylepis, Buddleja,  and Escallonia are trees found at lower elevations.

Fauna
Darwin's rhea (Pterocnemia pennata) and the puna mouse (Punomys lemminus) are endemic bird and mammal species found here. Vicuña (Vicugna vicugna), guanaco (Lama guanicoe), chinchilla (Chinchilla brevicaudata), and viscacha (Lagidium) are also present. Threatened bird species include the royal cinclodes (Cinclodes aricomae), the tamarugo conebill (Conirostrum tamarugense), James's flamingo (Phoenicopterus jamesi), and the giant coot (Fulica gigantea).

Protected areas
18.68% of the ecoregion is in protected areas. These include:
Tariquía Flora and Fauna National Reserve
Cordillera de Sama Biological Reserve
Aymara Lupaca Reserved Zone
Salinas and Aguada Blanca National Reservation
Cotahuasi Subbasin Landscape Reserve

References

Ecoregions of the Andes
Tropical Andes
Ecoregions of Peru
Ecoregions of Bolivia
Ecoregions of Argentina